The 2009 East Asia-Pacific Trophy was an international cricket tournament played in ODI format at Apia, Samoa between 19 and 25 September 2009. Eight men's national teams participated in the tournament which was split into two divisions; the three nations from the World Cricket League played in division one, and the remaining five nations played in division two.

In the division one competition, after a round robin group stage of four matches, Papua New Guinea easily beat the Fiji in the final.

In the division two competition, after a round robin group stage of four matches, Vanuatu easily beat the Samoa in the final. As a result of winning the tournament, Vanuatu earned promotion to both Division Eight of the World Cricket League and Division One of the EAP Trophy.

Teams

Division 1

Division 2

Group stages

Division 1
Papua New Guinea was undefeated after the round-robin stage.

Division 2
Vanuatu was undefeated after the round-robin stage.

Play-offs
There were four play-off matches to decide the final standings.

Interdivisional match

3rd place play-off (Div 2)

Final (Div 2)

Final (Div 1)

Final standings

Division 1

Division 2

References

External links

International cricket in 2009

International cricket competitions in Samoa
ICC EAP Cricket Trophy
2009 in Samoan sport